West Fork School District may refer to:

 West Fork School District (Arkansas)
 West Fork Community School District (Iowa)